Vitālijs Rubenis (February 26, 1914, Moscow – January 2, 1994) was a Latvian communist politician. He was born in the Russian Empire. He was Chairman of the Soviet of Nationalities from 1974 to 1984. He was a member of the Communist Party of Latvia. He was a recipient of the Order of Lenin. He died in Moscow.

References

1914 births
1994 deaths
Politicians from Moscow
People from Moskovsky Uyezd
Central Committee of the Communist Party of the Soviet Union members
Chairmen of the Soviet of Nationalities
Sixth convocation members of the Soviet of Nationalities
Seventh convocation members of the Soviet of Nationalities
Eighth convocation members of the Soviet of the Union
Ninth convocation members of the Soviet of Nationalities
Tenth convocation members of the Soviet of Nationalities
Eleventh convocation members of the Soviet of Nationalities
Communist Party of Latvia politicians
Heads of state of the Latvian Soviet Socialist Republic
Heads of government of the Latvian Soviet Socialist Republic
Recipients of the Order of Lenin
Burials in Troyekurovskoye Cemetery